The Last Movie Stars is a limited documentary series originated by Emily Wachtel and directed by Ethan Hawke. After discovering transcripts of interviews conducted at Paul Newman's request for an abandoned memoir project, a daughter of Newman and Joanne Woodward asked Hawke to tell their story, personally and as artists. Hawke assembled actors to read pieces of the interviews, conducted and edited by writer Stewart Stern, including interviews with Newman and Woodward. The marriage spanned 50 years and was often cited as one of the great Hollywood successful marriages and love stories.

The six hour documentary takes an unusual approach to telling Newman and Woodward's story, unfolding decades of material and dramatizing interview transcriptions to create a narrative around their relationship and evolving acting careers. Hawke described their influence in shifting acting styles to a more nuanced and natural approach: "Their generation changed American acting. What happened in the fifties with the Actors Studio with Elia Kazan and Tennessee Williams is a pivot point in the history of performance. It radically changed the way that we tell stories and we’re still reacting to it." Paul Newman was a member of and studied with the Actors Studio. Joanne Woodward also studied at the Actors Studio and worked with Sanford Meisner in the Neighborhood Playhouse School of the Theatre where they met many of those interviewed for this documentary.

Many of the older interviews with friends and artistic collaborators are read by the cast over archival footage. Recent interviews with all three of their daughters as well as Sally Field and Martin Scorsese are included.

The interviews were the basis for Newman's postumously published 2022 memoir, The Extraordinary Life of an Ordinary Man.

Cast
Joanne Woodward as herself
Paul Newman as himself

The players
Laura Linney as Joanne Woodward
George Clooney as Paul Newman
Karen Allen as Joanne Woodward's stepmother, Frances Woodward
Brooks Ashmanskas as Gore Vidal
Rose Byrne as Estelle Parsons
Bobby Cannavale as Elia Kazan
Billy Crudup as James Goldstone
Ben Dickey as Mark Rydell, Joanne's roommate
Vincent D'Onofrio as John Huston, Karl Malden
Josh Hamilton as George Roy Hill
Sterlin Harjo as Robert Altman
Oscar Isaac as Sydney Pollack
Latanya R. Jackson as Maude Brink, Joanne's aunt
Zoe Kazan as Jackie McDonald (Newman's first wife, aka Jackie Witte)
Tom McCarthy as Sidney Lumet
Alessandro Nivola as Richard Brooks, Robert Redford
Barry Poltermann as Stewart Stern
Sam Rockwell as Stuart Rosenberg, director of Cool Hand Luke
Mark Ruffalo as Meade Roberts
Jonathan Marc Sherman as Martin Ritt
Steve Zahn as Donald "Duck" Dobbins

Original interviews
 Stephanie Newman
Martin Scorsese
Billy Crudup
Sanford Meisner
Sidney Lumet
Ewan McGregor
Melissa Newman
Nell Newman
 Clea Newman
Maya Hawke
Mario Andretti
Anne Keefe
Mark Wade 
Sally Field
A. E. Hotchner
David Letterman
 Henry Elkind
 Peter Elkind
Emily Wachtel
Ryan Hawke
Zoe Kazan
Sam Rockwell
 Mark Wade
James Ivory
Richard Linklater

Episodes

Production
Along with Martin Scorsese and Courtney Sexton, Amy Entelis also served as executive producer. The docuseries was produced by Emily Wachtel and Lisa Long Adler of Nook House Productions, Ryan Hawke of Under the Influence Productions, and Adam Gibbs. There was no original cinematography as the film's visuals consist entirely of existing elements (such as film clips and photos) combined with Zoom recordings recorded by Hawke. Barry Poltermann edited all six episodes. Hamilton Leithauser composed the original score, and the song "Beautiful People, Beautiful Problems" by Lana Del Rey and Stevie Nicks is featured prominently in the trailer.

Release
Episode 1 of The Last Movie Stars was first screened at the SXSW Film Festival on March 14, 2022. Episodes 3 and 4 were screened at the Cannes Film Festival on May 21, 2022. CNN+ was originally set to stream the series but after it dissolved, HBO Max became its new home. It was released on HBO Max on July 21, 2022 with all six episodes appearing at once.

Reception
The review aggregator website Rotten Tomatoes reported a 100% approval rating with an average rating of 9.2/10, based on 21 critic reviews. The website's critics consensus reads, "The Last Movie Stars delivers the goods as a revealing retrospective of Paul Newman and Joanne Woodward's romance, but director Ethan Hawke elevates this docuseries into a revelatory exploration of marriage and stardom." 

The Guardian called the docuseries "a case study in fandom practiced properly," noting that the documentary series deals with Newman's failings as a parent and his alcoholism, while at the same time taking a worshipful attitude toward its subjects. Its review observed that Hawke "makes no effort to minimize his own presence under some pretense of fly-on-the-wall objectivity. As much as his extensive research project exists to chronicle the lives and works of a Hollywood power couple in a league of their own, he also digests the narrative at hand by examining his own relationship to it."

The New York Times television critic Mike Hale called the series "charming, entertaining and, for the eyes, addictive." But he added that "as the story gets darker over the years, the series loses some of its verve, and it starts to feel like a forced march through the two stars’ movie and TV catalogs. Hawke doesn’t seem as comfortable, or as interested, whenever the subject moves away from acting." The poor quality of many of their movies, he asserted, is glossed over.

References

External links 

American documentary films
CNN Films films
Documentary films about actors
2020s American documentary television series
2022 American television series debuts
English-language television shows
Films directed by Ethan Hawke
Directors
HBO Max original programming